Gypsy is an American drama streaming television series created by Lisa Rubin for Netflix. Naomi Watts stars as Jean Holloway, a psychologist who secretly infiltrates the private lives of her patients. Billy Crudup co-stars as her husband Michael. The first season comprises 10 episodes and was released on June 30, 2017.

In February 2016, Sam Taylor-Johnson was announced as the director for the first two episodes of the series, in addition to an executive producer. Moreover, Lisa Rubin serves as executive producer and showrunner.

Stevie Nicks re-recorded an acoustic version of her Fleetwood Mac song "Gypsy" to serve as the show's theme song. On August 11, 2017, the show was cancelled after one season.

Cast and characters

Main 
 Naomi Watts as Jean Holloway, PhD, a clinical psychologist based in New York City, who oversteps personal and professional boundaries as she begins to develop relationships with people close to her patients, under the alias Diane Hart
 Billy Crudup as Michael Holloway, Jean's husband and a partner at Cooper, Woolf & Stein
 Sophie Cookson as Sidney Pierce, a manipulative, attractive woman who is a member of a band, the Vagabond Hotel; she also works as a barista, is Sam's ex-girlfriend, and lusts for Jean
 Karl Glusman as Sam Duffy, a young man failing to move on from a break-up with his ex-girlfriend, Sidney. He is one of Jean's patients.
 Poorna Jagannathan as Larin Inamdar, a divorced therapist, and Jean's best friend and colleague
 Brooke Bloom as Rebecca Rogers, Claire's estranged daughter
 Lucy Boynton as Allison Adams, a former college student who is addicted to drugs and is one of Jean's patients
 Melanie Liburd as Alexis Wright, Michael's personal assistant (PA), whom Jean distrusts
 Brenda Vaccaro as Claire Rogers, Rebecca's neurotic mother who is obsessed about her adult daughter's life choices and is a patient of Jean's

Recurring
 Kimberly Quinn as Holly Faitelson
 Edward Akrout as Zal
 Blythe Danner as Nancy, Jean's mother
 Frank Deal as Gary Levine
 Shiloh Fernandez as Tom
 Evan Hoyt Thompson as Frances
 Maren Heary as Dolly Holloway
 Vardaan Arora as Raj
 Erin Neufer as Emily
 Kerry Condon as Melissa Saugraves

Episodes

Reception
Review aggregator website Rotten Tomatoes gave the first season a 40% rating based on 42 reviews, with an average rating of 5.15/10. The critics consensus states, "Gypsys ludicrous plot trudges along, dragging a talented cast with it." Metacritic gave the season a rating of 45 out of 100, based on 21 critics, indicating "mixed or average reviews".

The show has been criticized by Roma organizations for its use of the term "gypsy". Many Romani people consider this to be an ethnic slur due to its historical use in antiziganist violence, including laws authorizing the enslavement, branding, deportations, and murder of Romanichal (British Roma) during the Tudor period in England.

References

External links
 
 

2010s American LGBT-related drama television series
2017 American television series debuts
2017 American television series endings
American thriller television series
Bisexuality-related television series
English-language Netflix original programming
Psychological thriller television series
Television controversies in the United States
Television series by Universal Television
Television shows filmed in New York City
Television shows set in Connecticut
Television shows set in New York City